A back vowel is any in a class of vowel sound used in spoken languages. The defining characteristic of a back vowel is that the highest point of the tongue is positioned relatively back in the mouth without creating a constriction that would be classified as a consonant. Back vowels are sometimes also called dark vowels because they are perceived as sounding darker than the front vowels.

Near-back vowels are essentially a type of back vowels; no language is known to contrast back and near-back vowels based on backness alone.

The category "back vowel" comprises both raised vowels and retracted vowels.

Articulation

Partial list
The back vowels that have dedicated symbols in the International Phonetic Alphabet are:

 close back unrounded vowel 
 close back protruded vowel 
 near-close back protruded vowel 
 close-mid back unrounded vowel 
 close-mid back protruded vowel 
 open-mid back unrounded vowel 
 open-mid back rounded vowel 
 open back unrounded vowel 
 open back rounded vowel 

There also are back vowels that don't have dedicated symbols in the IPA:

 close back compressed vowel  or 
 near-close back unrounded vowel  or 
 near-close back compressed vowel  or 
 close-mid back compressed vowel  or 
 mid back unrounded vowel  or 
 mid back rounded vowel  or 

See also
Front vowel
Central vowel
List of phonetics topics
Relative articulation

References

Vowels by backness